Robert A. Wood is an American diplomat who is the Alternate Representative of the United States of America for Special Political Affairs in the United Nations, with the rank of Ambassador.

Early life and education
Wood earned a B.A. from the City University of New York.

Career
Wood served as the U.S. Ambassador to the Conference on Disarmament in Geneva, Switzerland, from 2014 until 2021. During that time, he also served as the United States Commissioner to the Bilateral Consultative Commission of the New START Treaty, and as the United States Special Representative for Biological Weapons Convention (BWC) issues. He was Deputy Chief of Mission, U.S. Mission to the European Union in Brussels, Belgium. He also served as Deputy Chief of Mission at the U.S. Mission to International Organizations in Vienna, Austria. Wood was the Deputy Spokesperson and Deputy Assistant Secretary in the Bureau of Public Affairs in the Department of State, and an Information Officer at U.S. Embassy in Berlin, Germany. Wood was also deputy director of Communications and Spokesperson at the U.S. Mission to the United Nations in New York.

Other assignments include Senior Advisor in the Office of the Stability Pact for Southeast Europe; Special Assistant in the Office of the Under Secretary of Public Diplomacy; Executive Assistant in the Office of the Counselor of the United States Information Agency; Public Affairs Officer in the Bureau of African Affairs; Desk Officer for Egypt, Yemen, and Sudan; and Near East Regional Program Officer in the United States Information Agency. Other overseas postings include Islamabad, Pakistan, Lagos, Nigeria, and Mexico City, Mexico.

Alternate Representative to the UN
On December 15, 2021, President Joe Biden nominated Wood to be the Alternate Representative of the United States of America for Special Political Affairs in the United Nations, with the rank of Ambassador. Hearings on his nomination were held before the Senate Foreign Relations Committee on June 23, 2022. The committee favorably reported his nomination on July 19, 2022. His nomination was confirmed before the full United States Senate.

Personal life
Wood speaks Spanish, German, and French.

References

External links

American diplomats
United States Department of State officials
City University of New York alumni
Living people
Year of birth missing (living people)